Transformational leadership is a theory of leadership where a leader works with teams or followers beyond their immediate self-interests to identify needed change, creating a vision to guide the change through influence, inspiration, and executing the change in tandem with committed members of a group; This change in self-interests elevates the follower's levels of maturity and ideals, as well as their concerns for the achievement.  it is an integral part of the Full Range Leadership Model. Transformational leadership  is when leader behaviors influence followers and inspire them to perform beyond their perceived capabilities. Transformational leadership inspires people to achieve unexpected or remarkable results. It gives workers autonomy over specific jobs, as well as the authority to make decisions once they have been trained. This induces a positive change in the followers attitudes and the organization as a whole. Transformational leaders typically perform four distinct behaviors, also known as the four I's. These behaviors are inspirational motivation, idealized influence, intellectual stimulation, individualized consideration.

Transformational leadership serves to enhance the motivation, morale, and job performance of followers through a variety of mechanisms; these include connecting the follower's sense of identity and self to a project and to the collective identity of the organization; being a role model for followers in order to inspire them and to raise their interest in the project; challenging followers to take greater ownership for their work, and understanding the strengths and weaknesses of followers, which allows the leader to align followers with tasks that enhance their performance. It is also important to understand the qualities a transformational leadership can bring to a work organization. Transformational leadership enhances commitment, involvement, loyalty, and performance of followers. Followers exert extra effort to show support to the leader, emulate the leader to emotionally identify with him/her, maintain obedience without losing any sense of self esteem. Transformational leaders are strong in the abilities to adapt to different situations, share a collective consciousness, self-manage, and be inspirational while leading a group of employees.Transformational leadership can be practiced but is arguably the most efficient when it is authentic to that individual. These types of leaders focus on how decision making benefits their organization and the community rather than for personal gains. A transformational leader by all accounts is a good leader. They show sound values, good judgement, and great character.

Inspirational motivation is when the leader inspires their followers to achieve. This leader sets high and reasonable goals for their followers and their organization. They inspire commitment and they create a shared vision for their organization. Leaders that utilize inspirational motivation motivate followers extrinsically and intrinsically, and they are able to articulate their expectations clearly. Inspirational motivation is closely tied to productivity. Productivity leads directly to having a source of worth, and could be considered both inspirational and visionary, leading to a positive emotional impact on that leader's followers.

Idealized influence is when the leader acts as a strong role model for their organization and leads by example. These types of leaders consider the needs of their followers and prioritize their needs. They typically have loads of commitment and are very ethical. Followers of these leaders typically try to emulate their leader as they tend to identify with them easily. When subordinates try to emulate their leader, emotional attachments tend to form. Although controversial, Adolf Hitler would be an example of a leader that had profound emotional impact on his subordinates.

Intellectual stimulation is when the leader encourages their followers to think for themselves. These leaders are creative, innovative, and are very open to new ideas. They tend to be tolerant of their followers' mistakes, and even encourage them as they believe they promote growth and improvement within the organization. These leaders create learning opportunities for their followers and abandon obsolete practices.

Individualized consideration is when the leader establishes a strong relationship with their followers. These leaders act as a caring supportive resource for their followers and their organization. They mentor their followers and allocate their time to developing their followers potential. One of the ways in which leaders can develop their followers is by delegating specific tasks that will foster an individual's development.

Origins 
The concept of transformational leadership was initially introduced by James V. Downton, the first to coin the term "transformational leadership", a concept further developed by leadership expert and presidential biographer James MacGregor Burns. According to Burns, transformational leadership can be seen when "leaders and followers make each other advance to a higher level of morality and motivation." Through the strength of their vision and personality, transformational leaders are able to inspire followers to change expectations, perceptions, and motivations to work towards common goals. Burns also described transformational leaders as those who can move followers up on Maslow's hierarchy, but also move them to go beyond their own interests. Unlike in the transactional approach, it is not based on a "give and take" relationship, but on the leader's personality, traits and ability to make a change through example, articulation of an energizing vision and challenging goals. Transforming leaders are idealized in the sense that they are a moral exemplar of working towards the benefit of the team, organization and/or community. Burns theorized that transforming and transactional leadership were mutually exclusive styles. Later, researcher Bernard M. Bass expanded upon Burns' original ideas to develop what is today referred to as Bass’ Transformational Leadership Theory. According to Bass, transformational leadership can be defined based on the impact that it has on followers. Transformational leaders, Bass suggested, garner trust, respect, and admiration from their followers.

Bernard M. Bass (1985), extended the work of Burns (1978) by explaining the psychological mechanisms that underlie transforming and transactional leadership. Bass introduced the term "transformational" in place of "transforming." Bass added to the initial concepts of Burns (1978) to help explain how transformational leadership could be measured, as well as how it impacts follower motivation and performance. The extent to which a leader is transformational, is measured first, in terms of his influence on the followers. The followers of such a leader feel trust, admiration, loyalty and respect for the leader and because of the qualities of the transformational leader are willing to work harder than originally expected. These outcomes occur because the transformational leader offers followers something more than just working for self-gain; they provide followers with an inspiring mission and vision and give them an identity. The leader transforms and motivates followers through their idealized influence, intellectual stimulation and individual consideration. In addition, this leader encourages followers to come up with new and unique ways to challenge the status quo and to alter the environment to support being successful. Finally, in contrast to Burns, Bass suggested that leadership can simultaneously display both transformational and transactional leadership.

In 1985, transformational leadership had become more defined and developed whereby leaders known to use this style possessed the following traits: idealized influences, productive commitment, and inspirational motivation. Transformational leadership made transactional leadership more effective.

Definitions 

According to Bass, transformational leadership encompasses several different aspects, including:   
 Emphasizing intrinsic motivation and positive development of followers  
 Raising awareness of moral standards  
 Highlighting important priorities  
 Fostering higher moral maturity in followers  
 Creating an ethical climate (share values, high ethical standards)  
 Encouraging followers to look beyond self-interests to the common good  
 Promoting cooperation and harmony  
 Using authentic, consistent means  
 Using persuasive appeals based on reason  
 Providing individual coaching and mentoring for followers  
 Appealing to the ideals of followers  
 Allowing freedom of choice for followers
Transformational leaders are described to hold positive expectations for followers, believing that they can do their best. As a result, they inspire, empower, and stimulate followers to exceed normal levels of performance. Transformational leaders also focus on and care about followers and their personal needs and development. Transformational leaders fit well in leading and working with complex work groups and organizations, where beyond seeking an inspirational leader to help guide them through an uncertain environment, followers are also challenged and feel empowered; this nurtures them into becoming loyal, high performers.

There are 4 components to transformational leadership, sometimes referred to as the 4 I's:
 Idealized Influence (II) – the leader serves as an ideal role model for followers; the leader "walks the talk," and is admired for this. A transformational leader embodies the qualities that he/she wants in his/her team. In this case, the followers see the leader as a model to emulate. For the followers, it is easy to believe and trust in a transformational leader. This is also referred to as charisma and showing a charismatic personality influences the followers to become more like their leader.
 Inspirational Motivation (IM) – Transformational leaders have the ability to inspire and motivate followers through having a vision and presenting that vision. Combined, these first two I's are what constitute the transformational leader's productivity. A transformational leader manages to inspire the followers easily with clarity. The transformational leader convinces the followers with simple and easy-to-understand words, as well as with their own image. Throughout history, these are people who inspire their organization, their political party or candidate, or even their entire country through their vision. 
 Individualized Consideration (IC) – Transformational leaders demonstrate genuine concern for the needs and feelings of followers and help them self-actualize. This personal attention to each follower assists in developing trust among the organization's members and their authority figure(s). For example, the transformational leader can point out the problems of a  member working in a group. From this perspective, the leader can work towards training and developing a follower who is having difficulties in a job. This is an important element because teams are able to rely on and work together, so decisions can be made more quickly, while the transformational leader increases their buy-in.
 Intellectual Stimulation (IS) – the leader challenges followers to be innovative and creative, they encourage their followers to challenge the status quo. A common misunderstanding is that transformational leaders are "soft," but the truth is that they constantly challenge followers to higher levels of performance.  Transformational leaders challenge their followers preconceptions and encourage creativity, whether that creativity is innate or learned, transformational leaders their followers connect the dots. 
Transformational leadership is said to have occurred when engagement in a group results in leaders and followers raising one another to increased levels of motivation and morality.  It is not enough to make the correct choice, but to make the moral choice. In simple words, a transformational leader is not selfish and sees an opportunity of growth in others. Transformational leadership enhances intellectual stimulation through employee training and development.

Transformational leaders do one thing transactional leaders don't, which is going beyond self-actualization. The importance of transcending self-interests is something lost sight of by those who see that the ultimate in maturity of development is self-actualization. Bass. (1999).

Leader Personalities
The appeal or, or preference to engage in, transformational leadership may be influenced by leaders' personalities. The assertive-directing personality type, as measured by the Strength Deployment Inventory shows a moderate positive correlation with transformational leadership at 0.438. While leaders with different types showed correlations with other leadership styles. The altruistic-nurturing type correlated with servant leadership, analytic-autonomizing leaders correlated with transactional leadership, and those with a flexible-cohering type correlated with situational leadership.

Five major personality traits have been identified as factors contributing to the likelihood of an individual displaying the characteristics of a transformational leader. Different emphasis on different elements of these traits point to inclination in personality to inspirational leadership, transactional leadership, and transformational leadership. These five traits are as follows.

Extraversion 
The two main characteristics of extraverts are affiliation and agency, which relate to the social and leadership aspects of their personality, respectively. Extraversion is generally seen as an inspirational trait usually exhibited in transformational leadership.

Neuroticism 
Neuroticism generally gives an individual an anxiety related to productivity which, in a group setting can be debilitating to a degree where they are unlikely to position themselves in a role of transformational leadership due to lower self-esteem and a tendency to shirk from leadership responsibilities. When neuroticism is reverse-scored, it reflects emotional stability, which would yield a positive correlation to transformational leadership.

Openness to experience 
Creative expression and emotional responsiveness have been linked to a general tendency of openness to experience. This trait is also seen as a component of transformational leadership as it relates to the ability to give big-picture visionary leadership for an organization.

Agreeableness 
Although not a trait which specifically points to transformational leadership, leaders in general possess an agreeable nature stemming from a natural concern for others and high levels of individual consideration. Productivity  and idealized influence is a classic ability of individuals who possess agreeability.

Conscientiousness 
Strong sense of direction and the ability to put large amounts of productive work into tasks is the by-product of conscientious leaders. This trait is more linked to a transactional form of leadership given the management-based abilities of such individuals and the detail oriented nature of their personality. Results suggest that transformational leaders might give greater importance to values pertaining to others than to values concerning only themselves.

Studies have shown that subordinates' and leaders' ratings of transformational leadership may not converge. According to leaders' self‐ratings, the extraverted, intuitive and perceiving preferences favour transformational leadership. On the contrary, subordinates' ratings indicated that leaders with sensing preference are associated with transformational leadership.

Measurement 
One of the ways in which transformational leadership is measured is through use of the Multifactor Leadership Questionnaire (MLQ), a survey which identifies different leadership characteristics based on examples and provides a basis for leadership training.  Early development was limited because the knowledge in this area was primitive, and as such, finding good examples for the items in the questionnaire was difficult.  Subsequent development on the MLQ led to the current version of the survey, the MLQ5X.

The current version of the MLQ5X includes 36 items that are broken down into 9 scales with 4 items measuring each scale. Subsequent validation work by John Antonakis and his colleagues provided strong evidence supporting the validity and reliability of the MLQ5X. Indeed, Antonakis went on to confirm the viability of the proposed nine-factor MLQ model, using two very large samples. Although other researchers have still been critical of the MLQ model, since 2003 no one has been able to provide dis-confirming evidence of the theorized nine-factor model with such large sample sizes as those published by Antonakis.

In regards to transformational leadership, the first 5 components – Idealized Attributes, Idealized Behaviors, Inspirational Motivation, Intellectual Stimulation, and Individualized Consideration – are considered to be transformational leadership behaviors.

Effectiveness as compared to other leadership styles 
Studies have shown that transformational leadership styles are associated with positive outcomes in relation to other leadership styles.  It is suggested that transformational leadership augments transactional in predicating effects on follower satisfaction and performance. According to studies performed by Lowe, Kroeck, and Sivasubramaniam, productivity  (or Idealized Influence) was found to be a variable that was most strongly related to leader effectiveness among MLQ scales.  Other studies show that transformational leadership is positively associated with employee outcomes including commitment, role clarity, and well-being. However, the effectiveness of transformational leadership varies by the situational contexts. For example, it can be more effective when applied to smaller, privately held firms than complex organizations based on its outreach effect with members of the organization. However, it can be concluded that transformational leadership has a positive effect on organizational effectiveness. This is because transformational leaders can encourage and facilitate change in their subordinates and encourage their development and creativity.

Transformational leadership focuses on discrepancy creation. Transformational leaders motivate employees to go above and beyond to surpass prior goal levels.

Transactional leadership 
In contrast to transformational leadership, transactional leadership styles focus on the use of rewards and punishments in order to achieve compliance from followers. According to Burns, the transforming approach creates significant change
in the life of people and organizations. It redesigns perceptions and values, and changes expectations and aspirations
of employees. Unlike in the transactional approach, it is not based on a "give and take" relationship, but on the leader's personality, traits and ability to make a change through example, articulation of an energizing vision and
challenging goals.

Transformational leaders look towards changing the future to inspire followers and accomplish goals, whereas transactional leaders seek to maintain the status quo, not aiming for progress. Transactional leaders frequently get results from employees by using authority, while transformational leaders have a true vision for their company, are able to inspire people, and are entirely committed to their work. In summary, transformational leaders focus on vision, use charisma and enthusiasm for motivation, and are proactive in nature. On the other hand, transactional leaders focus on goals, use rewards and punishments for motivation, and are reactive in nature.

The MLQ does test for some transactional leadership elements – Contingent Reward and Management-by-Exception – and the results for these elements are often compared to those for the transformational elements tested by the MLQ.  Studies have shown transformational leadership practices lead to higher satisfaction with leader among followers and greater leader effectiveness, while one transactional practice (contingent reward) lead to higher follower job satisfaction and leader job performance.

Laissez-faire leadership 
In a laissez-faire leadership style, a person may be given a leadership position without providing leadership, which leaves followers to fend for themselves.  This leads to subordinates having a free hand in deciding policies and methods.

Studies have shown that while transformational leadership styles are associated with positive outcomes, laissez-faire leadership is associated with negative outcomes, especially in terms of follower satisfaction with leader and leader effectiveness.  Also, other studies comparing the leadership styles of men and women have shown that female leaders tend to be more transformational with their leadership styles, whereas laissez-faire leadership is more prevalent in male leaders.

Comparison of Styles among Public and Private Companies 
Lowe, Kroeck, and Sivasubramaniam (1996) conducted a meta-analysis combining data from studies in both the private and public sector. The results indicated a hierarchy of leadership styles and related subcomponents. Transformational Leadership characteristics were the most effective; in the following order of effectiveness from most to least: productive-inspiration, intellectual stimulation, and individual consideration. Transactional Leadership was the next most effective; in the following order of effectiveness from most to least: contingent reward and managing-by-exception. Laissez Faire leadership does not intentionally intervene, and as such, is not measured, and has no effectiveness score.

Table 2.3

Correlations With Effectiveness in Public and Private Organizations

Results of a meta-analysis of effectiveness of as adapted by Bass (2006) in Transformational Leadership.

Factors affecting use 
Phipps suggests that the individual personality of a leader heavily affects their leadership style, specifically with regard to the following components of the Five-factor model of personality: openness to experience, conscientiousness, extraversion/introversion, agreeableness, and neuroticism/emotional stability (OCEAN).

Phipps also proposed that all the Big Five dimensions would be positively related to transformational leadership. Openness to experience allows the leader to be more accepting of novel ideas and thus more likely to stimulate the follower intellectually. Conscientious leaders are achievement oriented and thus more likely to motivate their followers to achieve organizational goals. Extraverted and agreeable individuals are more outgoing and pleasant, respectively, and more likely to have successful interpersonal relationships. Thus, they are more likely to influence their followers and to be considerate towards them. Emotionally stable leaders would be better able to influence their followers because their stability would enable them to be better role models to followers and to thoroughly engage them in the goal fulfillment process.

A specific example of cultural background affecting the effectiveness of transformational leadership would be Indian culture, where a nurturant-task style of leadership has been shown to be an effective leadership style. Singh and Bhandarker (1990) demonstrated that effective transformational leaders in India are likes heads of Indian families taking personal interest in the welfare of their followers. Leaders in Indian organizations are therefore more likely to exhibit transformational behaviors if their followers are more self-effacing in approaching the leaders. It is also hypothesized in general that subordinates’ being socialized to be less assertive, self-confident, and independent would enhance superiors’ exhibition of transformational leadership.

Follower characteristics, combined with their perceptions of the leader and their own situation, did appear to moderate the connection between transformational leadership and subordinates’ willingness to take charge and be good organizational citizens. For instance, if subordinates in a work group perceive their leader to be prototypical of them, then transformational leadership would have less of an impact on their willingness to engage in organizational citizenship behaviors. Likewise, if subordinates are goal oriented and possess a traditional view of the organizational hierarchy, they tend to be less affected by transformational leadership. Self-motivated employees are less likely to need transformational leaders to prod them into action, while “traditionalists” tend to see positive organizational citizenship as something expected given their roles as followers—not something they need to be “inspired” to do.

Evidence suggests that the above sets of factors act, in essence, as both inhibitors of and substitutes for transformational leadership. As inhibitors, the presence of any of these factors—either independently or especially collectively—could make the presence of a transformational leader “redundant” since followers’ positive behavior would instead be sparked by their own motivations or perceptions. On the other hand, when these factors are not present (e.g., employees in a work group do not see their leader as “one of us”), then transformational leadership is likely to have a much greater impact on subordinates. In essence, when such “favorable conditions” are not present, managers—and the organizations they work for—should see a better return on investment from transformational leadership.

It was shown that leader continuity enhanced the effect of transformational leadership on role clarity and commitment, indicating that it takes time before transformational leaders actually have an effect on employees. Furthermore, co-worker support enhanced the effect on commitment, reflecting the role of followers in the transformational leadership process. However, there are also factors that would serve to balance the exhibition of transformational leadership, including the organizational structure, ongoing change, the leaders’ working conditions, and the leaders' elevated commitment of organizational value.

Outcomes
Bernard Bass in Leadership and Performance Beyond Expectations states some leaders are only able to extract competent effort from their employees, while others inspire extraordinary effort.  Transformational leadership is the key (Bass, 1985).

Implementing transformational leadership has many positive outcomes not only in the workplace but in other situations as well. Evidence shows that each of the previously talked about four components of transformational leadership are significantly associated with positive emotions and outcomes in the workplace as well as in team projects performed online. One recent study indicates that these four components are significantly associated with higher job satisfaction and the effectiveness of the employees. Both intellectual stimulation and inspirational motivation are associated with a higher degree of positive emotions such as enthusiasm, happiness, and a sense of pride in the follower's life and work.

Companies seem to be transforming everywhere; growth and culture change are a focus within their core strategies. It is not necessarily about cost structure, but about finding new ways to grow. Models need to be produced to help leaders create the future. Kent Thirty, CEO of DaVita, chose the name DaVita, Italian for “giving life,” and settled on a list of core values that included
service excellence, teamwork, accountability, and fun. A transformational leader inspires and follows the employee's self-interests, while a transactional leader manages and reinforces generally without employee consideration. Aligning the organization into transformational leaders by committing, being involved, and developing with the employees will lead to higher job satisfaction and motivation.

When transformational leadership was used in a nursing environment, researchers found that it led to an increase in organizational commitment. A separate study examined that way that transformational leadership and transactional leadership compare when implemented into an online class. The results of this study indicate that transformational leadership increases cognitive effort while transactional leadership decreases it.

Examples

Nelson Mandela
Nelson Mandela used transformational leadership principles while working to abolish apartheid and enforce change in South Africa.  In 1995, he visited Betsie Verwoerd, the widow of the architect of apartheid Hendrik Verwoerd, at her home in Orania.  Orania was an Afrikaner homeland and a striking anachronistic symbol of racial separation, and Mandela's recurring emphasis on forgiveness contributed toward the healing the prejudices of South Africa and as vast influence as a leader.  In 2000, he was quoted as saying, "For all people who have found themselves in the position of being in jail and trying to transform society, forgiveness is natural because you have no time to be retaliative." This illustrates a common approach in the narratives of transformational leadership, of describing a collective or corporate effort in individualised terms, and pointing to the responsibility or opportunity for individuals to commit to making the effort a success. Such an approach is seen in community organising.

He also set an example for others to follow in terms of sacrifice and philanthropy.  Schoemaker describes one such instance:

Future 

The evolution of transformational leadership in the digital age is tied to the development of organizational leadership in an academic setting. As organizations move from position-based responsibilities to task-based responsibilities, transformational leadership is redefined to continue to develop individual commitment to organizational goals by aligning these goals with the interests of their leadership community. The academic community is a front-runner in this sense of redefining transformational leadership to suit these changes in job definition.

The future of transformational leadership is also related to political globalization and a more homogenous spectrum of economic systems under which organizations find themselves operating. Cultural and geographical dimensions of transformational leadership become blurred as globalization renders ethnically specific collectivist and individualistic effects of organizational behavior obsolete in a more diversified workplace.

The concept of transformational leadership needs further clarification, especially when a leader is labelled as a transformational or transactional leader. While discussing  Jinnah's leadership style, Yousaf (2015) argued that it is not the number of followers, but the nature of the change that indicates whether a leader is transformational or transactional.

References 

Leadership